Caterina Magni (born 1966) is an Italian-born French archaeologist and anthropologist, who specialises in the study of pre-Columbian cultures of Mesoamerica, and in particular the iconography, art and mythology and religion of the Olmec civilization. From 2001 Magni has held a Maître de conférences position in Mesoamerican archaeology at the University of Paris IV: Paris-Sorbonne, Paris.

Magni has authored a number of articles on Olmec iconography for scientific journals, and two books.

She is a member of the Société Archéologique du Midi de la France (SAMF).

Published works
Published works by Magni include:
authored books—

External links
 Curriculum vitae (MAGNI, Caterina) at Paris-Sorbonne (Paris IV) 

1966 births
Living people
French Mesoamericanists
Women Mesoamericanists
Italian Mesoamericanists
Olmec scholars
French archaeologists
French anthropologists
French women anthropologists
Paris-Sorbonne University alumni
20th-century Mesoamericanists
21st-century Mesoamericanists
French women archaeologists
Academic staff of Paris-Sorbonne University
20th-century French women writers
21st-century French women writers